The Kennedy Bridge (German: Kennedybrücke) is the middle of Bonn's three Rhine bridges (North, Kennedy and South bridge), connecting the city center of Bonn on the left side with the town center of Beuel (which was incorporated into Bonn in 1969) on the right side. The second Reconstruction, which began in 2007, was finished in July 2011.

The history of the Kennedy Bridge

Connection between Bonn and Vilich (now Beuel)

Today's Kennedy Bridge is not the first connection between Bonn's two Rhine shores. There had already been a regular ferry service since the 17th Century. After the traffic grew faster and faster as well as high and low water, fog, ice or darkness complicated the transport, the city of Bonn made first plans of a bridge to the right bank of the Rhine in 1889. The citizens of Bonn started talks with the community of Vilich (the term „Beuel“ was first established in 1922). But it was a hard run until the festive inauguration of the first Rhine bridge on December 17, 1898. First, a dispute had to be clarified: the "Fähraktiengesellschaft", the community of the so-called "Fährbeerbten" (ferrymen) who hold the „Fährrechte“ (rights of ferry shipping) in this section of the Rhine, feared great financial losses. On May 13, 1896, the city of Bonn and the "Fährbeerbten" both agreed on a payment of 190,000 marks, and a further compensation of 30,000 marks.

Financing

Before the beginning of the construction — not unlike today — the financing had to be guaranteed. Negotiations with various banks were unsuccessful. German Empire, Prussia and Rhine Province were also defeated, so the city had to bear the full costs, which the Council officially decided in 1894.

Initially the construction costs were estimated at 2.58 million Mark. The citizens of Bonn wanted the town of Vilich to share costs with 10%, but the local council just offered the quite insufficient sum of 2,500 marks (0.1%). They feared that the construction would exceed the estimated costs. Therefore, the Vilichers were more interested in an end point of the bridge closer to their town's center. Instead, Bonn wanted the most economical connection for their business center „Markt“ across the former Vierecksplatz, the area of today's Bertha-von-Suttner-Platz and the Berliner Freiheit. Bonn rejected the modest participation  and after a long wrangling they agreed that the „Rechtsrheinischen“ (people living on the right bank of the Rhine) offer the space for the bridge ramp on their side for free and build a road to link their town with the bridge (because the bridge ended in no-man's-land there at this time) and Bonn paid for the bridge.

The largest and most beautiful bridge over the Rhine

In July 1895, a competition for the bridge was announced. Gutehoffnungshuette from Oberhausen, R. Schneider from Berlin and the architect Bruno Moehring won the 1st prize awarded with 8,000 marks. The winners also received the contract to build the bridge. In April 1896 the construction began and 33 months later the bridge was opened for public traffic. At this time, with a main span of 188 meters, it was the largest and by its situation in front of the picturesque Siebengebirge most beautiful bridge over the Rhine.

The financing of the finally 4 million marks (155% of the first estimation) was realized by a public loan. From the beginning, all passers had to pay a bridge toll. This toll was hang up for cars in 1927 and finally for all passers in 1938.

Renaming to Klaus-Clemens Bridge, destruction and first reconstruction
Like every public building, the Rhine bridge was not spared from the era of National Socialism. The Nazis renamed the bridge to Klaus-Clemens Bridge (after a SA official from Bonn). On March 8, 1945 at 8:20 PM, only two months before the end of World War II, the fleeing Wehrmacht destroyed the bridge, but the bombing didn't really stop the Allies.

Soon after the destruction ferries, boats and some truck ferries transferred goods and people between both sides. From August 29, 1945, on Bonn's Committee for Urban Planning, the "Bauausschuss", dealt with the construction of a new bridge and released the plans in March 1946. In September 1946 Stahlbau Rheinhausen and Grün & Bilfinger started with the construction. The bridge was built on the nearly intact pillows within 36 months. On November 12, 1949 the new bridge was opened.

Renaming to Kennedy Bridge
On December 2, 1963, just ten days after the assassination of U.S. President John F. Kennedy the bridge was renamed to Kennedy Bridge in the presence of U.S. Ambassador George McGhee and Bonn's mayor Dr. Wilhelm Daniels.

Second reconstruction

According to another report in September 2005, the sidewalks were completely blocked for safety reasons and the city's Council decided the reconstruction and widening at the earliest possible moment. Subsequently, the funding of the 40 million Euro has been guaranteed. The 3-phased reconstruction (north side, south side, road surface) began on April 16, 2007 and should be completed in April 2010 (later delayed to July 2011). After the reconstruction the bridge is 10 meters wider than before (26.80 meters in total).
Until the completion the whole traffic (cars and tram) was contracted to the two central lanes. Pedestrians and cyclists had to use one of the closed road lanes (depending on the reconstructed bridge side).

See also
List of memorials to John F. Kennedy

References
 The history of the Kennedy bridge at Bonn's website (German language).

External links
 Photos of the 2nd reconstruction at an unofficial Beuel blog (German language).

Bridges over the Rhine
Road bridges in Germany
Buildings and structures in Bonn
Former toll bridges in Germany
Bridges in North Rhine-Westphalia